Hylettus coenobita is a species of longhorn beetles of the subfamily Lamiinae. It was described by Wilhelm Ferdinand Erichson in 1847, and is known from Guatemala, Panama, Brazil, Bolivia, Peru, eastern Ecuador, and French Guiana.

References

Beetles described in 1847
Beetles of South America
Hylettus